Trum y Gwragedd is a top of Foel y Geifr in the Hirnantau. These hills rise from the south east shores of Llyn Tegid.

The summit is boggy and marked by a few stones. To the south is Foel y Geifr and to the north is Foel Goch (Hirnant).

References

Llangywer
Mountains and hills of Gwynedd
Mountains and hills of Snowdonia
Nuttalls